= Collected Poems in English =

Poetry collection by Joseph Brodsky

- Author: Joseph Brodsky
- Language: English
- Genre: Poetry
- Published: 2000
- Publisher: New York: Farrar, Straus and Giroux
- Publication place: United States

Collected Poems in English is a collection of the English poetry of Joseph Brodsky. It is the most comprehensive to date. The collection was released in 2000, edited by Ann Kjellberg. The full name of the collection is Collected Poems in English, 1972–1999.
